Wyler Aerial Tramway is an aerial tramway in El Paso, Texas, United States. The tramway is operated by the Texas Parks and Wildlife Department and is located in Franklin Mountains State Park. The trip takes about four minutes and lifts riders up 940 vertical feet above the boarding area. From Ranger Peak you can see three states and two countries on a clear day. The tramway was closed indefinitely to the public in September 2018.

History
The tramway was built in 1959 by KTSM radio to aid in the construction of a transmitter tower. Karl O. Wyler managed the project. First opening to the public as the El Paso Aerial Tramway, the facility provided rides from 1960 to 1986, when high liability insurance costs forced the tram to stop public operations. The tram was only used to service the transmitter towers. Wyler donated the tramway for public use in his will. The Texas Parks and Wildlife Department accepted the donation in 1997 and renovated and re-opened the tramway to the public in 2001. The tramway was closed indefinitely in September 2018 after the Texas Parks and Wildlife conducted an engineering analysis that concluded "the tram has surpassed its life expectancy and is no longer suited for public use." TPWD estimates the replacement of the tram would cost millions of dollars and the agency does not have the financial resources to execute a capital construction project of this size at this time.

Gallery

References

External links

Wyler Aerial Tramway
Summitpost.org - Ranger Peak
Home movie of the Franklin Mountains State Park from the Sandoval Family on the Texas Archive of the Moving Image

Aerial tramways in the United States
Transportation buildings and structures in El Paso County, Texas
Tourist attractions in El Paso, Texas
Transportation buildings and structures in Texas
1959 establishments in Texas